Felicity Ann Dahl ( D'Abreu; born 12 December 1938) is a British film producer who married the author Roald Dahl in 1983. She was previously married to Charles Reginald Hugh Crosland. The quietly spoken Dahl gave a rare interview in November 2008 to publicise the inaugural Roald Dahl Funny Prize and reflect on her years with the late author.

Early life 
In December 1938, Felicity D'Abreu was born in Llandaff, a district in the north of Cardiff, in Wales. It was coincidentally the birthplace of her future husband Roald Dahl in 1916.

She was the daughter of Pr. Alphonsus D'Abreu and Elizabeth Throckmorton (granddaughter of Sir Richard Charles Acton Throckmorton, 10th Baronet) and the niece of Lt.-Col. Francis D'Abreu who was married to Margaret Bowes-Lyon, the first cousin of the Queen Mother.

Career

Film production 
Dahl served as producer of the 1996 film Matilda and was executive producer of the 2005 film Charlie and the Chocolate Factory. Her three preferred choices for the role of Willy Wonka in the film were Eddie Izzard, David Walliams and Dustin Hoffman, but she heartily approved of the casting of Johnny Depp.

Her name "Lissy Dahl" was used as inspiration for the doll owned by Miss Honey in Matilda.

Charity work 
Felicity Dahl founded the Roald Dahl Foundation in 1991 which helped young people with brain, blood and literacy problems. This organisation became Roald Dahl's Marvellous Children's Charity in 2010, focusing on supporting seriously ill children. She is co-president and an active supporter even after retiring as a trustee in the mid 2010s. She also founded the Roald Dahl Museum and Story Centre in Great Missenden, opened in 2005, to carry on the literary legacy, creativity and imagination of Roald Dahl's work.

Personal life 
In 1959, Felicity D'Abreu married Charles Reginald Hugh Crosland. They had three children together. In 1971, she divorced Crosland.

She met Roald Dahl while she was working as a set designer on an advert for Maxim coffee with the author's then wife, American actress Patricia Neal. Soon after the pair were introduced, they began an 11-year relationship before they eventually wed in 1983, at Brixton Town Hall in South London. Dahl gave up her job and moved into Gipsy House, in Great Missenden in Buckinghamshire, which had been Roald Dahl's home since 1954. They remained married until his (Roald's) death at Oxford's John Radcliffe Hospital in 1990.

In 1991, she published Memories with Food at Gipsy House, a collection of anecdotes and recipes that she had written with her late husband.

On 14 September 2009 the first blue plaque in Roald Dahl's honour was unveiled at a sweet shop in Llandaff. Dahl was present for the unveiling of the plaque dedicated to her late husband.

Filmography

References

External links 
 

Living people
1938 births
British film producers
Felicity